Vadakakku Oru Hridayam is a 1978 Malayalam film, directed by I. V. Sasi and written by Padmarajan. The film is based on a novel of the same name, written by Padmarajan. It stars Jayabharathi, Madhu, Soman and Raghavan in the lead roles. It was dubbed and released in Hindi as Man Ka Aangan. In 2009, the film was remade into a Malayalam TV serial with the same title on Amrita TV under the direction of cameraman K.K. Rajeev. The script is by P. Ananthapadmanabhan, son of the legendary writer and filmmaker Padmarajan. The series starred Jayakrishnan, Kavitha Nair and Shalu Menon.

Soundtrack 
The music was composed by G. Devarajan and the lyrics were written by Kavalam Narayana Panicker.

Box office
The film was both a critical and commercial success.

References

External links
 
 Vadakakkoru Hridayam at the Malayalam Movie Database

1970s Malayalam-language films
Films based on Indian novels
Indian erotic films
Films with screenplays by Padmarajan
Films directed by I. V. Sasi